Eloria noyesi, the coca tussock moth, is a moth of the subfamily Lymantriinae first described by Schaus in 1927. It is beige and its larvae feed on coca plants. It is found mostly in Peru and Colombia. The government of Colombia has proposed a plan to release large numbers of these moths to destroy the coca crops in their country.

References

 "Scientists believe insects would kill coca crops". (June 9, 2005). NBC News.com. Retrieved March 26, 2020.
 Schlotterbeck, Isaac (June 5, 2015). "Eloria Noyesi: Colombia's Potential Solution to Eradicating Illicit Coca". Council on Hemispheric Affairs. Retrieved March 26, 2020.

Lymantriinae